Keenan Burton (born October 29, 1984) is a former American football wide receiver. He was drafted by the St. Louis Rams in the fourth round of the 2008 NFL Draft. He played college football at Kentucky.

Early years
Burton attended DuPont Manual Magnet High School in Louisville, Kentucky and was a letterman in football for the Crimsons. At the school he played many positions from quarterback to safety. He started the last three of his four seasons with the team, lining up mostly at quarterback on offense, although he did see some action as a receiver, running back, and kick returner. He helped the school attend four Class-AAAA State Playoffs. Burton carried the ball 274 times for 1,634 yards (6.0-yard average) and 25 touchdowns during his career. He completed 81 of 226 passes (35.8%) for 1,605 yards and 17 scores. He also recorded 98 tackles, along with 30 pass deflections and 10 interceptions, returning two of those picks for touchdowns, adding another score on a punt return. Burton was named the MVP of the Kentucky/Tennessee High School All-Star game in 2003.

College career
Burton attended college at the University of Kentucky and participated in their football program while attending the school for a degree in Agricultural communications. Burton turned down offers from Northwestern University, Indiana University, Marshall University, University of Louisville, Miami University (Ohio) and Boston College.

During his tenure on the football team in the 2004 and 2005 seasons he would only play in 8 games. Prior to the 2004 season opener, Burton suffered a left wrist fracture and would play in the first game before being side lined by the coaching staff. In 2005, he would suffer a foot injury that would result in two surgeries.

Burton played in 45 games total in his career at Kentucky as a wide receiver and kick returner. He ranks fourth in school history in receptions, third in receiving yards, second in touchdowns, and he ranks third in all purpose yards and was the fifth player to amass over 4,000 all purpose yards.

2006

In 2006, Keenan would flourish since he wasn't plagued with injuries for the first time since 2003. Burton led the Wildcats with 77 receptions for 1,036 yards and 12 touchdowns. He led the Wildcats in kick returns, averaging 24.7 yards per return. He had one kickoff return for a touchdown in the team's season opener in Louisville. In his kick returning duties he ranked second in the SEC. He was the third player ever in the school's history to go over a 1,000 yards receiving in a single season and his 12 touchdowns ranked 2nd on the single season chart for the school.

The team would play in the Music City Bowl and Burton would catch only 5 passes for 30 yards in the game. However Kentucky went on to win the game.

2007
Burton began his senior season with the Wildcats strong. In the first five games of the season he would compile 422 receiving yards and 5 touchdowns. However struck by flu like symptoms and sprains in the knee and ankle would limit his playing time. He still managed to be second on the team for the season in receiving with 685 yards and 9 touchdowns.

The team earned another trip to the Music City Bowl and again Burton would be limited in his performance. He would catch 7 passes for 56 yards. The team would win the game just as they did last year despite the low performance.

Burton would skip the Senior Bowl to undergo arthroscopic surgery on his knee following the completion of the season.

Professional career

Pre-draft
Burton, along with Kentucky teammate Andre Woodson, was invited to the 2008 NFL Scouting Combine in Indianapolis, Indiana. Burton was a top performer in the vertical jump, broad jump, 3 cone drill, 20-yard shuttle, and 60 yard shuttle events at the combine. He placed first in the vertical jump with a 38.5 in. high jump. Burton also placed third in the 60-yard shuttle with a time of 11.36 seconds.

Pre-draft measurables

St. Louis Rams
Burton would be selected 128th overall in the fourth round of the 2008 NFL Draft by the St. Louis Rams. He signed a three-year, $1.459 million contract with the Rams on July 4, 2008. The deal included a $309,000 signing bonus. Burton finished his rookie season with 13 receptions for 172 yards and one touchdown.

In 2009 Burton entered the Rams' Week 10 game against New Orleans as the team's leading receiver with 25 catches. However, his season ended in the first quarter with a knee injury when he landed awkwardly on a long pass route. "It's a patella injury," His coach, Steve Spagnuolo said. "It's a pretty bad injury." Burton became the third wide receiver, to go on the injured reserve list that season. The other wideouts on IR are Laurent Robinson and 2009 draft pick Brooks Foster.

On September 7, 2010, Burton was released by the St. Louis Rams to make room for wide receiver Mark Clayton on the 53-man roster. Burton played in 22 games as a Ram, including seven starts, totaling 38 receptions for 425 yards and one touchdown.

References

External links

 
 Player page on NFL.com

1984 births
Living people
American football wide receivers
Kentucky Wildcats football players
St. Louis Rams players
DuPont Manual High School alumni
Players of American football from Louisville, Kentucky